This article contains information about the literary events and publications of 2015.

Events
January 21 – The British Broadcasting Corporation (BBC) launches a six-part television miniseries of Hilary Mantel's Booker Prize-winning novels Wolf Hall and Bring Up the Bodies.
March 8 – The BBC launches a new television series of Winston Graham's Poldark novels.
March 19 – Kim Thúy's novel Ru wins the 2015 edition of Canada Reads.
July 7 – Jeff Lindsay releases his final novel in the "Dexter" series, writing off Dexter Morgan two years after the final episode in the television series.
c. October 14 – Start of Causeway Bay Books disappearances: Five staff of the political bookseller Causeway Bay Books in Causeway Bay, Hong Kong, go missing, apparently detained by mainland Chinese authorities.
November 10 – The Bodleian Library of the University of Oxford acquires its twelve millionth book, a unique copy of Shelley's subversive Poetical Essay on the Existing State of Things "by a Gentleman of the University of Oxford", published in 1811.
November 25 – Singapore's Media Development Authority lifts prohibitions on 240 publications under the Undesirable Publications Act.
unknown date – English author Iain Pears' novel Arcadia is accompanied as an electronic book by an interactive app allowing readers to switch between multiple narratives.

Anniversaries
January 4 – 50th anniversary of the death of Anglo-American poet T. S. Eliot
April 23 – Centenary of the death of English poet Rupert Brooke, on active service
June – Centenary of the publication of T. S. Eliot's "The Love Song of J. Alfred Prufrock"
June 10 – Centenary of Saul Bellow's birth
June 13 – 150th anniversary of W. B. Yeats, who was born on this date in 1865
September 26 – 75th anniversary of his death of Walter Benjamin
October – Centenary of the publication of Franz Kafka's The Metamorphosis (Die Verwandlung).
November 26 – 150th anniversary of the publication of Lewis Carroll's Alice's Adventures in Wonderland
October 21 – 75th anniversary of the publication of Ernest Hemingway's For Whom the Bell Tolls
December 21 – 75th anniversary of the death of American novelist F. Scott Fitzgerald
December 23 – Bicentenary of the publication of Jane Austen's Emma

New books
The date in brackets after a title refers to U.S. publication unless otherwise stated.

Fiction
Rabai al-Madhoun – Destinies: Concerto of the Holocaust and the Naqba
André Alexis – Fifteen Dogs
Isabel Allende – El amante japonés (The Japanese Lover)
Claudia Amengual – Cartagena (April 28)
Margaret Atwood – The Heart Goes Last
Leigh Bardugo – Six of Crows 
Paul Beatty – The Sellout (March 3)
Pierce Brown – Golden Son (January 6)
Graeme Macrae Burnet – His Bloody Project (UK, November 6)
Mark Z. Danielewski
The Familiar, Volume 1: One Rainy Day in May (May 12)
The Familiar, Volume 2: Into the Forest (Oct 27)
Mathias Énard – Boussole (Compass)
Lissa Evans – Crooked Heart (UK, December)
Raymond Carver – Beginners (September 15)
Anne Enright – The Green Road
Jonathan Franzen – Purity (September 1)
Sarah Hall – The Wolf Border (UK)
Paula Hawkins – The Girl on the Train (January 13)
Lawrence Hill – The Illegal
John Irving – Avenue of Mysteries (November 3)
Kazuo Ishiguro – The Buried Giant (March 3)
Miranda July – The First Bad Man (January 13)
Stephen King
Finders Keepers (June 2)
The Bazaar of Bad Dreams (November 3)
Harper Lee – Go Set a Watchman (July 14; written c.1955)
Sarah J. Maas – A Court of Thorns and Roses 
Michael Livingston – The Shards of Heaven (November 24)
Tom McCarthy – Satin Island (UK)
Ian McDonald – Luna: New Moon (September 17)
Lisa McInerney – The Glorious Heresies (April)
Henning Mankell (d. October 15) –  (Sweden; translated as After the Fire, 2017)
Toni Morrison – God Help the Child (April 21)
Ottessa Moshfegh – Eileen (August)
Haruki Murakami (村上 春樹) – Wind/Pinball: Two Novels (August 4)
Viet Thanh Nguyen – The Sympathizer
Chigozie Obioma – The Fishermen
Max Porter – Grief is the Thing with Feathers (UK, September 17)
Orhan Pamuk – A Strangeness in My Mind (October 20)
Sunjeev Sahota – The Year of the Runaways (UK, June)
John Scalzi – The End of All Things (August 11)
Roger Scruton – The Disappeared (March 5)
Joss Sheldon – Occupied (UK, October 20)
Neal Stephenson – Seveneves (May 19)
Anne Tyler – A Spool of Blue Thread
Guy Vanderhaeghe – Daddy Lenin and Other Stories
Sarai Walker – Dietland (May 26)
Hanya Yanagihara – A Little Life

Children and young people
Kevan Atteberry – Bunnies!!!
Bob Barner - Sea Bones
Janeen Brian - I’m A Hungry Dinosaur
Sarah Crossan – One (verse, UK, August 27)
Brian Falkner - Battlesaurus: Rampage at Waterloo
Nadia Fink (illustrated by Pitu Saá) – Frida Kahlo for Girls and Boys (Frida Kahlo para chicas y chicos) (Argentina, June, first in Anti-Princess Series (Colección antiprincesas))
Peter Goes – Timeline
Jane Godwin – The True Story of Mary
Frances Hardinge – The Lie Tree (UK, May 7)
Moriah McStay – Everything That Makes You
Carol Morley – 7 Miles Out
Barry Moser – We Were Brothers
Lesléa Newman – Ketzel, the Cat who Composed
Jerry Pinkney – The Grasshopper & the Ants
Rick Riordan
Percy Jackson's Greek Heroes (August 18)
The Sword of Summer (October 6)
R. A. Spratt - Friday Barnes, Under Suspicion
Yasmine Surovec – My Pet Human

Poetry

Drama
Annie Baker – John
David Hare – The Moderate Soprano
Lynn Nottage – Sweat
Tom Stoppard – The Hard Problem (UK, February 5)

Non-fiction
Elizabeth Alexander – The Light of the World: A Memoir
Björk – Archives
Carrie Brownstein – Hunger Makes Me A Modern Girl
Noam Chomsky – Because We Say So
Kate Christensen – How To Cook A Moose: A Culinary Memoir
Alexa Clay and Kyra Maya Phillips – The Misfit Economy
Ta-Nehisi Coates - Between the World and Me (July)
Isaac Deutscher – The Prophet: The Life of Leon Trotsky
Kim Gordon – Girl in a Band
Greg Grandin – Kissinger's Shadow: The Long Reach of America's Most Controversial Statesman
Chris Hedges – Wages of Rebellion: The Moral Imperative of Revolt
Tameka Hobbs - Democracy Abroad, Lynching At Home
Robert Hughes – The Spectacle of Skill: Selected Writings (November 17)
W. Chan Kim and Renée Mauborgne – Blue Ocean Strategy (expanded edition)
B. B. Lal –  The Rigvedic People: Invaders? Immigrants? or Indigenous?
Zachary Leader – The Life of Saul Bellow: To Fame and Fortune, 1915–1964
Mark Levin – Plunder and Deceit
Bethany McLean – Shaky Ground: The Strange Saga of the U.S. Mortgage Giants
Alberto Manguel – Curiosity (literary criticism)
Minae Mizumura (translated by Mari Yoshihara and Juliet Winters Carpenter) – The Fall of Language in the Age of English
Maggie Nelson – The Argonauts
Jay Parini – Empire of Self: A Life of Gore Vidal
Marilynne Robinson – The Givenness of Things: Essays (October 27)
Oliver Sacks – Gratitude
Ruth Scurr – John Aubrey: My Own Life
James Shapiro – The Year of Lear: Shakespeare in 1606
Steve Silberman – The Legacy of Autism and the Future of Neurodiversity
Aaron Swartz – The Boy Who Could Change the World: The Writings of Aaron Swartz (November 26, UK)
Edmund de Waal – The White Road. A Pilgrimage of Sorts (porcelain)
Jim Wallis – America's Original Sin
Rainn Wilson - The Bassoon King

Deaths
January 1 – Miller Williams, American poet, 84 (born 1930)
January 4 – Michele Serros, American novelist, poet, and staff writer, 48 (born 1966)
January 10 – Robert Stone, American novelist, 77 (born 1937)
January 12 – John Bayley, novelist and critic, 89 (born 1925)
January 25 – John Leggett, American author and academic, 97 (born 1917)
January 27 – Suzette Haden Elgin, American linguist and science fiction author, 78 (born 1936)
January 28 – Lionel Gilbert, Australian historian, author, and academic, 90 (born 1924)
January 29 – Colleen McCullough, Australian author, 77 (born 1937)
February 6
André Brink, South African novelist and professor of literature, (born 1935)
Assia Djebar, Algerian novelist, translator and filmmaker, (born 1936)
February 13 – Faith Bandler, Australian author and civil rights activist, 96 (born 1918)
February 14 – Philip Levine, American poet laureate, 87 (born 1928)
February 23 – James Aldridge, Australian-born British novelist and journalist, 96 (born 1918)
February 26
Fritz J. Raddatz, German feuilleton writer, essayist and biographer (suicide, born 1931)
Avijit Roy, Bangladeshi-American writer, 42 (stabbed, born 1972)
February 28 – Yaşar Kemal, Turkish writer and intellectual (born 1923)
March 12 – Sir Terry Pratchett, English author of fantasy novels, 66 (posterior cortical atrophy, born 1948)
March 18 – Grace Ogot, Kenyan writer, 84 (born 1930)
March 24 – Alan Seymour, Australian playwright, 87 (born 1927)
March 26 – Tomas Tranströmer, Swedish poet, translator, and Nobel prizewinner, 83 (born 1931)
April 9 – Ivan Doig, American novelist, 75 (born 1939).
April 13
Eduardo Galeano, Uruguayan journalist, writer and novelist, 74 (lung cancer, born 1940)
Günter Grass, German novelist, poet, playwright, and Nobel prizewinner, 87 (lung infection, born 1927)
April 15 – Rosemary Tonks, English poet and novelist, 85 (born 1928)
May 2 – Ruth Rendell, English crime and thriller writer, 85 (born 1930)
May 2 – William Zinsser American journalist and critic (born 1922)
May 20 – J. S. Harry, Australian poet, 76 (born 1939)
May 23 – Moyra Caldecott, English writer, 87 (born 1927)
June 19 – James Salter, American novelist and short-story writer, 90 (born 1925)
July 21 – E. L. Doctorow, American novelist, 84 (born 1931) 
July 31 – Alan Cheuse, American writer and radio reviewer, 75 (born 1940)
August 30 – Oliver Sacks, British neurologist and author (Awakenings), 82 (born 1933)
October 2 – Brian Friel, Irish playwright and short-story writer, 86 (born 1929)
October 5 – Henning Mankell, Swedish novelist, children’s author and playwright, 67 (born 1948)
October 7 – W. R. Mitchell, English journalist and author, 87 (born 1928)
October 18
Gamal El-Ghitani, Egyptian novelist and cultural critic, 70 (born 1945)
Paul West, English-born American novelist, poet and essayist, 85 (born 1930)
November 30:
Dan Fante, American author and playwright, 71 (born 1944)
Hazel Holt, English novelist, 87 (born 1928)
November 30 – Fatema Mernissi, Moroccan scholar and writer, 75 (born 1940)
December 5 – William McIlvanney, Scottish novelist, short-story writer and poet, 79 (born 1936)
December 9 – Akiyuki Nosaka, Japanese writer (Grave of the Fireflies), 85 (born 1930)
December 16 - Peter Dickinson, English author and poet (born 1927)

Awards
Anisfield-Wolf Book Award, U.S.: A Brief History of Seven Killings by Marlon James
Baileys Women's Prize for Fiction: How to Be Both by Ali Smith
Caine Prize for African Writing: Namwali Serpell, The Sack
Camões Prize, Portugal: Hélia Correia
David Cohen Prize: Tony Harrison
Dayne Ogilvie Prize, Canada: Alex Leslie
Desmond Elliott Prize, U.K.: Our Endless Numbered Days by Claire Fuller
DSC Prize for South Asian Literature: The Lowland by Jhumpa Lahiri, India
Folio Prize, U.K.: Family Life by Akhil Sharma
European Book Prize: Jean-Pierre Orban, Vera and, Robert Menasse, Der Europäische Landbote
German Book Prize: Die Erfindung der Roten Armee Fraktion durch einen manisch-depressiven Teenager im Sommer 1969 by Frank Witzel
Golden Wreath of Struga Poetry Evenings, Macedonia: Bei Dao (China) 
Goldsmiths Prize, U.K.: Beatlebone by Kevin Barry
Gordon Burn Prize, U.K.: In Plain Sight: The Life and Lies of Jimmy Savile by Dan Davies
Governor General's Award for English-language fiction, Canada: Guy Vanderhaeghe, Daddy Lenin and Other Stories
Governor General's Award for French-language fiction, Canada: Nicolas Dickner, Six degrés de liberté
Grand Prix du roman de l'Académie française: Les Prépondérants by Hédi Kaddour; 2084: la fin du monde by Boualem Sansal
International Prize for Arabic Fiction: The Italian by Shukri Mabkhout, Tunisia
International Dublin Literary Award: Harvest by Jim Crace
Kerry Group Irish Fiction Award: Blue Is the Night by Eoin McNamee
Man Booker Prize: A Brief History of Seven Killings by Marlon James
Miguel de Cervantes Prize: Fernando del Paso
Miles Franklin Award: The Eye of the Sheep by Sofie Laguna
National Book Award for Fiction, U.S.: Fortune Smiles By Adam Johnson
Nobel Prize in Literature: Svetlana Alexievich, Belarus
PEN/Faulkner Award for Fiction: Preparation for the Next Life by Atticus Lish
PEN Center USA 2015 Fiction Award: Robert Thomas, Bridge
Premio Planeta de Novela, Spain: Hombres desnudos by Alicia Giménez-Bartlett; La isla de Alice by Daniel Sánchez Arévalo
Premio Strega, Italy: Nicola Lagioia
Pritzker Literature Award for Lifetime Achievement in Military Writing, U. S.: David Hackett Fischer
Prix Goncourt: Boussole by Mathias Énard
Pulitzer Prize for Fiction, U.S.: All the Light We Cannot See by Anthony Doerr
Pulitzer Prize for Poetry: U.S.: Digest by Gregory Pardlo
RBC Taylor Prize, Canada: They Left Us Everything by Plum Johnson
Rogers Writers' Trust Fiction Prize, Canada: André Alexis, Fifteen Dogs
Russian Booker Prize: Vera by Alexander Snegirev
SAARC Literary Award: Sitakant Mahapatra, Selina Hossain, Suman Pokhrel, Nisar Ahmad Chaudhary, Aryan Aroon 
Samuel Johnson Prize for Non-fiction, U.K.: Neurotribes: The Legacy of Autism and How to Think Smarter About People Who Think Differently by Steve Silberman
Scotiabank Giller Prize, Canada: André Alexis, Fifteen Dogs
Walter Scott Prize for Historical Fiction, U.K.: The Ten Thousand Things by John Spurling
Whiting Awards, U.S.: Fiction: Leopoldine Core, Dan Josefson, Azareen Van der Vliet Oloomi; Nonfiction: Elena Passarello; Plays: Lucas Hnath, Anne Washburn; Poetry: Anthony Carelli, Aracelis Girmay, Jenny Johnson, Roger Reeves
W. Y. Boyd Literary Award for Excellence in Military Fiction, U.S.: Redeployment by Phil Klay
Zbigniew Herbert International Literary Award: Ryszard Krynicki

See also
2015 in Australian literature
2015 in Japanese literature

References

External links
Books in 2015: the essential literary calendar from Books |The Guardian |January 2, 2015
The most eagerly awaited fiction of 2015 from Books| The Guardian| December 29, 2014

 
Years of the 21st century in literature